Vasil Emilov Popov (born 19 November 1995) is a Bulgarian footballer who plays as a defender.

Career
Born in Sofia, Popov began playing football in 2002, in the youth team of CSKA Sofia. He made his first team debut on 15 December 2012 at 17 years 17 days, in a 5–0 win over Chavdar Etropole for Bulgarian Cup, coming on as a substitute for Ivan Bandalovski. On 10 March 2013, Popov made his league debut, coming on as a first-half substitute during the 2–0 win over Chernomorets Burgas.

On 18 February 2017, Popov was loaned to Tsarsko Selo until the end of the season.

On 29 July 2017, Popov joined Lokomotiv Sofia.

On 2 July 2018, Popov signed a two years contract with Montana, following a successful trial period.

Honours

Club
CSKA Sofia
 Bulgarian Cup: 2015–16

References

External links

Profile at A-PFG website
Васил Попов: Сбъднах мечтата си, подписах с ЦСКА

1995 births
Living people
Footballers from Sofia
Bulgarian footballers
Bulgaria youth international footballers
PFC CSKA Sofia players
SFC Etar Veliko Tarnovo players
FC Tsarsko Selo Sofia players
FC Lokomotiv 1929 Sofia players
FC Oborishte players
FC Montana players
FC Septemvri Sofia players
First Professional Football League (Bulgaria) players
Second Professional Football League (Bulgaria) players
Association football defenders
Association football fullbacks